Journey (stylized in all caps) is the third extended play (EP) by Canadian singer and songwriter Henry. It was released on November 18, 2020 through Monster Entertainment Group, and distributed by Kakao M. The EP marks his first album release in 6 years and the first under his own independent label. "Radio" serves as the lead single for the album.

Background and release
After his contract with SM Entertainment expired in 2018, Henry established his own independent label, Monster, with his brother. He was reportedly in the process of recording a new album in 2019. He later scrapped a completed album several months prior to the release of Journey as he felt his sound had evolved and the album no longer headed in the musical direction he wanted.

First teaser images of the album was revealed through his Instagram on October 29, 2020. He first revealed the title of the album on Weverse on November 3. The full album track-list comprising five tracks was revealed on November 13, with "Radio" as the title track. The album along with the music video for "Radio" was released on November 18, marking Henry's first album release in 6 years. The music video for the B-side track "Just Be Me" was released two weeks later on December 3.

Reception
Seoulbeats described Journey as a "musically fulfilling" album that "shows his true colors while giving nods to his complicated musical past" and praised the interesting production elements which makes the album stand out from other recent solo releases. They highlighted the B-side "Just Be Me" as the stand-out track calling it an "effective and memorable power ballad" that rounds out the album. Allkpop was "pleasantly enthralled" by the album and stated that "Hand's Up" is a must-listen, describing it as "funky and groovy" and "immaculate in flow", and noted that the rap by pH-1 perfectly matched the energy of the song.

Track listing
Credits adapted from the album's liner notes and Melon.

Charts

Sales

Notes

References

2020 EPs
Henry Lau EPs
Kakao M EPs
Korean-language EPs